The corrida de sortija is a traditional gaucho sport of the Rio de la Plata area of South America. 

It was described by Thomas Hutchinson in 1868:

References

Sport in Argentina
Sport in Uruguay
Equestrian sports in Argentina
Equestrian sports in Uruguay
Mounted games